Ryo Takeuchi (竹内 涼, born March 8, 1991) is a Japanese football player currently playing for Shimizu S-Pulse.

Club statistics
Updated to 24 July 2022.

References

External links
Profile at Shimizu S-Pulse

1991 births
Living people
Association football people from Shizuoka Prefecture
Japanese footballers
J1 League players
J2 League players
Shimizu S-Pulse players
Giravanz Kitakyushu players
Association football midfielders